Nikara is a genus of moths of the family Noctuidae described by Frederic Moore in 1882.

Species
Nikara castanea Moore, 1882 (from India)
Nikara plusiodes de Joannis, 1914 (Yunnan, China)

References

Hadeninae